Bruninho is a Portuguese name that is a diminutive form of the male name Bruno. It may refer to the following people:

Bruninho (footballer, born 1986), Portuguese football midfielder
Bruninho (footballer, born 1988), Portuguese football midfielder
Bruninho (footballer, born 1989), Brazilian football midfielder
Bruninho (footballer, born 1992), Brazilian football midfielder
Bruninho (footballer, born 1993), Brazilian football defender
Bruninho (footballer, born 2000), Brazilian football midfielder
Bruninho (futsal player) (born 1997)